The Moto E3 (model XT1700) and the Moto E3 Power (model XT1706) are Android smartphones developed by Motorola Mobility, a subsidiary of Lenovo. These phones make up the third generation of the low-end Motorola Moto E series. The E3 was released in July 2016. The E3 Power was released through Flipkart in India in September 2016, and sold a record 100,000 units on its first day of sale.

The phones are available in black or white.

Their batteries are larger than average for their price point.  The standard E3 uses the Motorola GK40 battery with 2800 mAh capacity, and the Power model uses the 3500 mAh GK50. A notable feature of the E3 Power is that it supports rapid charging.

Both phones use the Mediatek MT6735P, a quad-core 1 GHz chipset.  The display is a 720p IPS LCD with Corning Gorilla Glass 3 protection.

The phones run the Android 6.0 Marshmallow operating system and there are no plans for a major Android update.

Reception 

Online reviews praised the Moto E3's excellent standby and screen-on time, with TechRadar stating it has "truly excellent stamina", thanks to its "undemanding" display. The E3 Power's battery life was also well-received.  General performance on both models was widely criticised, however, due to the low-end processor - TechRadar's review calls screen navigation "far from fluid", and gaming performance "far from satisfactory".

The design of the phones was praised, with reviewers pointing out the rarity of front-facing loud-speakers in smartphones.  Trusted Reviews calls the Moto E3 "a good-looking phone".

The camera was met with mixed reviews.  Trusted Reviews calls photos "very basic" and "a mess of white haze" in bright conditions, while TechRadar states camera performance is "surprisingly acceptable" and photos have "nicely balanced colours".

Generation comparison 

All three generations use micro-SIMs and micro-USB B power connectors.  Both models support OTG USB hosting.

References                             

Android (operating system) devices
Mobile phones introduced in 2016
Motorola smartphones